The División de Honor Femenina 2011–12 was the 55th season of women's handball top flight in Spain since its establishment. Season began 10 September 2011 and finished 12 May 2012. Fourteen teams took part in the competition, with BM Gijón, CB Kukullaga and CB Porriño replacing CP Goya Almería, CBF Monóvar and AD Sagardía.

SD Itxako won every match but one to lift its fourth championship in a row with a 5 points advantage over runner-up BM Bera Bera, which also qualified for the Champions League. BM Sagunto, BM Alcobendas and CB Mar Alicante followed in European positions while newly promoted Gijón and Kukullaga were relegated as the two bottom teams.

Financial strain led to major changes following the end of the season. 4-times champion CBF Elda asked to be relegated to the third tier on 18 June, Itxako renounced to its place in the Champions League three days later, and Mar Alicante also renounced to its European place on 9 July. Two days later BM Murcia became the second team relegated for financial reasons.

Teams

  Alcobendas
  Bera Bera
  Castro Urdiales
  Elche 
  Elda
  Gijón
  Itxako
  Kukullaga 
  León
  Mar Alicante
  Murcia 
  Porriño
  Remudas
  Sagunto

Standings

Statistics

Top goalscorers

References

External links
2011–12 season at RFEBM.net

División de Honor Femenina de Balonmano seasons
ABF
Spa
2011 in women's handball
2012 in women's handball